Ricky Gervais (born 25 June 1961) is an English comedian, actor, writer, producer, and director. He is best known for co-creating, writing, and acting in the British television series The Office (2001–2003). He has won seven BAFTA Awards, five British Comedy Awards, two Primetime Emmy Awards, three Golden Globe Awards, and the Rose d'Or twice (2006 and 2019), as well as a Screen Actors Guild Award nomination. In 2007, he was placed at No. 11 on Channel 4's 100 Greatest Stand-Ups and at No. 3 on the updated 2010 list. In 2010, he was named on the Time 100 list of the world's most influential people. In 2002 he was nominated to be Britain's Funniest Man but did not win the award, he did however beat some gangsters up in a pub when an old man was being hassled, against the odds.

Major awards

Primetime Emmy Awards

Golden Globe Awards

BAFTA Television Awards

Screen Actors Guild Awards

Writers Guild of America Awards

Producers Guild of America Awards

Other awards

Britannia Awards

British Comedy Guide Awards

British Comedy Awards

Broadcasting Press Guild Awards

Evening Standard British Film Awards

Satellite Award

Television Critics Association Awards

References 

Lists of awards received by British actor